The Al-Ahmadiya Mosque, also known as Mosque-Madrasa of Al-Ahmadiya or Al-Maidan Mosque, is a historic Sunni Islam mosque located in Baghdad, Iraq. The mosque is located at the Al Rasheed Street in the southern part of Al-Rusafa, and the east of the Al-Maidan Square near the Al-Muradiyya Mosque. 

The mosque was built in 1796 by Ahmad Pasha al-Katkhadha, the vice of the Mamluk ruler Sulayman Pasha the Great. The minaret was later added by his brother Abdullah Buk along with the madrasa. The mosque is also near the Al-Khulafa Mosque, the mosque dating back to the Abbasid era.

Inside the mosque, there is a wide prayer space in front of the corridor. A minaret is situated on the south of the dome. The wall of the mosque is painted with inscriptions of the Qur'anic verses, which was written by the calligrapher Sufyan al-Wahbi in 1850 who is buried in the mosque yard. The mosque was restored in 2010 before holding the conference for the cabinet of Waqf al-Sunna.

Gallery

See also

 Islam in Iraq
 List of mosques in Iraq
 List of mosques in Baghdad

References

18th-century mosques
Mosques in Baghdad
Ottoman mosques in Iraq
Sunni mosques in Iraq